Gerald Gow (29 May 1952 – 10 October 2016) was a  footballer who played for Bristol City in the 1970s, making 375 appearances for them in The Football League.

Playing career
Gow made his debut for Bristol City in 1970 at the age of 17. He was a member of the side which achieved promotion in 1976 to the First Division. He left Bristol City aged 28 following the team's relegation to the Second Division in 1980.

After his time at Bristol City he played for Manchester City, appearing in the 1981 FA Cup Final, and Rotherham United, before transferring to Burnley in August 1983. He then moved to Yeovil Town where he was player manager for a time.

Bristol City granted Gow a retrospective testimonial in 2012, when a Legends team played against a Manchester City Legends side.

In popular culture
Gerry Gow is mentioned in the song 'This One's for Now' by the band Half Man Half Biscuit on their album Urge For Offal.

Personal life
Gow's grandson is Eastleigh FC defender Brennan Camp.

Death
He died of cancer on 10 October 2016 at the age of 64.

References

1952 births
2016 deaths
Footballers from Glasgow
Scottish footballers
Scottish football managers
Bristol City F.C. players
Manchester City F.C. players
Rotherham United F.C. players
Burnley F.C. players
Yeovil Town F.C. players
Yeovil Town F.C. managers
Weymouth F.C. managers
Association football midfielders
Scotland under-23 international footballers
Place of death missing
FA Cup Final players